Mo Yun-tuan (11 May 1928 – 19 March 2018), known by the pen name Luo Fu, was a Taiwanese writer and poet.

Early life
He was born Mo Yun-tuan in 1928 and raised in Hengyang. Mo's first work was published in 1943. He joined the Republic of China Navy, and moved to Taiwan in 1949. Mo received a bachelor's degree in English from Tamkang University in 1973, the same year he retired from the navy. He married Chen Chiung-fang of Kinmen.

Career
In Taiwan, Mo published several collections of poetry, anthologies, and essays, as well as a number of translations. His own works were translated into several languages. Mo and his contemporary Yu Kwang-chung were described as the Gemini of Chinese poetry, in reference to the constellation depicting the mythological twins Castor and Pollux. He later left Taiwan for Canada in 1995. Wang Dan published a collection of poems titled Travel in Cold Alone in 2000, and cited Mo as an influence. Mo's poem "Driftwood" (2000) was nominated for the Nobel Prize for Literature in 2001. His final works were published in January 2018.

Death
In June 2016, Mo was diagnosed with adenocarcinoma of the lung. He died of respiratory complications on 19 March 2018, while seeking treatment at Taipei Veterans General Hospital.

References

2018 deaths
1928 births
Taiwanese poets
Republic of China poets
Poets from Hunan
People from Hengyang
Taiwanese people from Hunan
Tamkang University alumni
Taiwanese expatriates in Canada
20th-century Taiwanese poets
21st-century Taiwanese poets
Translators to Chinese
Taiwanese translators
Republic of China Navy sailors